The Plenty Highway is a  outback mostly unsealed road in the Northern Territory of Australia between the Stuart Highway and north-western Queensland.

Route description
It then continues for another   to Boulia in Queensland, as the Donohue Highway.

The first  from the Stuart Highway is sealed. Of the next  to Jervois Homestead all bar  is unsealed as is the rest of the track to the Queensland Border. Information about its condition may be obtained from the Harts Range police station,  from the Stuart Highway.

East of Jervois Homestead, the road is formed earth, deteriorating to rocks and bulldust as it nears Tobermorey,  from Jervois Homestead.  The road north to Urandangi and thence to Mount Isa bears left just before Tobermorey.

Road condition
The worst sections of the road are in the Northern Territory, with deep potholes and bulldust. On the Queensland side of the border the road has had significant upgrades and is of a hard pack gravel surface.

Fuel and food may be obtained at Gemtree, Atitjere community, Jervois Homestead and Boulia. As of June 2018, fuel and camping is available at Tobermorey.

Upgrades
The Northern Australia Roads Program announced in 2016 included the following project for the Plenty Highway.

Progressive sealing and flood immunity
The project to progressively seal and provide flood immunity improvements was expected to be complete in late 2021 at a total cost of $25 million.

Junctions and localities

See also

 Highways in Australia
 List of highways in the Northern Territory

References

Australian outback tracks
Highways in the Northern Territory